Right in Front of You may refer to:

 "Right in Front of You", a 2002 song by Celine Dion from A New Day Has Come
 "Right in Front of You" (Anna Abreu song), a 2014 song by Anna Abreu from V